KZMC (102.1 FM) is a radio station broadcasting a classic country format. Licensed to McCook, Nebraska, United States, the station is currently owned by Hometown Family Radio.

History
On May 30, 2014 KZMC changed their format from active rock (as "Z102.1") to classic country, branded as "True Country 102.1".

References

External links

ZMC